Newmill is a planned village  north of the town of Keith in the Moray council area of north-east Scotland. The resident population at the 2001 census was recorded as 452.

History
The current street-plan of the village was laid out in about 1759 by the Earls of Fife, but there are records of much earlier settlement dating back to 1535 when a meal mill was built by Bishop Crystall. The Castle of Glengerrick once stood at the site of the village church, now a private dwelling.

Slate from the local quarry was used in the renovation of Pluscarden Abbey and the Convent of Greyfriars in Elgin.

In 1905 the Newmill Literary Society, supported by the philanthropist Andrew Carnegie, built the Newmill Institute, now the Village Hall.

In the centre of the village square is a war memorial, a 4-stage clock tower, built 1922–23 and designed by F. A. Robertson.

Services
Services in Newmill include the village post office.

Education
The village is served by Newmill Primary School, whilst secondary pupils travel to Keith Grammar School.

Notable people 
James Gordon Bennett, Sr., founder and publisher of the New York Herald, grew up in Newmill.

References

External links 

 Newmill at Ordnance Survey GetOutside

Villages in Moray